Saša Stević (born 31 May 1981) is a former professional Bosnian Serb footballer.

Club career
Born in Banja Luka, SR Bosnia and Herzegovina. In 1997, Saša  began his football career playing for Rudar Prijedor as a 16-year-old. He made his debut against FK Glasinac Sokolac. Stević played for Rudar Prijedor until 2001 when he moved to Serbian club FK Borac Čačak where he played from 2001 until 2005. Then, he moved to Finland to play in Veikkausliiga club FF Jaro where he played the seasons 2005 and 2006.  In 2007, he moved to another Finish club IFK Mariehamn.

In summer 2008 he returned to the Serbian SuperLiga by joining FK Banat Zrenjanin. Played there season and half. And on winter transfers window 2010 he moved to Romania by joining Liga I side Ceahlăul Piatra Neamţ where he played the rest of the season.  In summer 2010 he moved to Ukraine and joined FC Volyn Lutsk.

He played much of his career in a central midfield role, but he has also been used as a central defender.

External links
 
 Saša Stević at Srbijafudbal
 

1981 births
Living people
People from Prijedor
Serbs of Bosnia and Herzegovina
Association football midfielders
Bosnia and Herzegovina footballers
FK Rudar Prijedor players
FK Borac Čačak players
FF Jaro players
IFK Mariehamn players
FK Banat Zrenjanin players
CSM Ceahlăul Piatra Neamț players
FC Volyn Lutsk players
FK Zemun players
Premier League of Bosnia and Herzegovina players
First League of Serbia and Montenegro players
Veikkausliiga players
Serbian SuperLiga players
Liga I players
Ukrainian Premier League players
Bosnia and Herzegovina expatriate footballers
Expatriate footballers in Serbia and Montenegro
Expatriate footballers in Finland
Expatriate footballers in Romania
Expatriate footballers in Ukraine
Expatriate footballers in Serbia
Bosnia and Herzegovina expatriate sportspeople in Serbia and Montenegro
Bosnia and Herzegovina expatriate sportspeople in Finland
Bosnia and Herzegovina expatriate sportspeople in Romania
Bosnia and Herzegovina expatriate sportspeople in Ukraine
Bosnia and Herzegovina expatriate sportspeople in Serbia